The 2007 Kansas City mayoral election was held March 2 and April 4, 2007, to elect the mayor of Kansas City, Missouri. It saw the election of Mark Funkhouser.

Results

Primary

General election

References

2000s in Kansas City, Missouri
2007 Missouri elections
2007 United States mayoral elections
2007
Non-partisan elections